Ichikawa Omezō as a Pilgrim and Ichikawa Yaozō as a Samurai is an ukiyo-e woodblock print dating to around 1801 by Edo period artist Utagawa Toyokuni I. Featuring two of the most prominent actors of the day as characters in a contemporary kabuki drama, it is a classic example of the kabuki-e or yakusha-e genre. The print is part of the permanent collection of the Royal Ontario Museum, Toronto, Canada.

Toyokuni and kabuki
Utagawa Toyokuni (歌川豐國), also known as Toyokuni I, was the second head of the Utagawa school, and one of the most influential print-makers of the Edo period. From early adolescence, he apprenticed with Utagawa Toyoharu, studying the style of his mentor, as well as those of Chōbunsai Eishi, Utamaro and Eishōsai Chōki.

Although his initial attempts met with failure, Toyokuni achieved commercial success in 1786 with illustrations for the kibyōshi novelette Tsugamonai hanashi no oyadama (無束話親玉). He soon discovered his niches:  bijinga and, more significantly, yakusha-e. Between 1794 and 1796, he created a series of prints entitled Yakusha butai no sugata-e ("Portraits of Actors in Various Roles" - 役者舞台の姿絵), which earned him "rapid recognition," and "marked the peak of his creative work." Toyokuni befriended prominent actors, and the "overwhelming majority" of his prints relate to kabuki.

Toyokuni's style is admired for its "powerful and vivid lines," "striking color contrasts," "decorative bombast," and "bold, taut designs." He is credited with the innovation of polytych formats, and with training many prominent pupils, including future masters Kunisada and Kuniyoshi.

Toyokuni is often compared with Sharaku, an artist active during 1794 who specialized in yakusha-e.  While Sharaku favoured an exaggerated, stylized approach, Toyokuni's depictions are more realistic, capturing actors "as they appear on stage" and idealizing them. His kabuki-e were more popular with contemporary audiences than those of his rival; however, modern critics tend to credit Sharaku with greater artistic acuity.

Toyokuni was highly prolific, and, by 1800, the Utagawa school had supplanted the Katsukawa as the major producers of kabuki-e. His success appears to have come at a price, however, as the consensus is that the quality of his later work "shows a marked decline," and even "degenerated frequently into sheer grotesquerie." Some also contend Toyokuni's talent was "predominantly imitative," more the product of study than "intuitive genius."

Ichikawa Omezō as a Pilgrim and Ichikawa Yaozō as a Samurai

Genre
An image of two actors posing as characters from a play, this print belongs to the kabuki-e (歌舞伎絵) genre, also known as shibai-e (芝居絵), gekijou-e (劇場絵), gekiga (劇画). Literally 'kabuki pictures', kabuki-e began to be produced in the late 17th century. As kabuki grew in popularity, audiences became increasingly interested in the actors. The emergence of star actors led to yakusha-e (役者絵), a subgenre of kabuki-e in which actors were depicted individually or, as in this print, in pairs. These images appeared as single-sheet prints or in books of actor prints called yakusha ehon (役者絵本).

Image
In this print, Toyokuni depicts a tableau of two of the most popular kabuki actors of the day in a scene from an unidentified play. The character in the foreground is a samurai. He wears waraji straw sandals, a casual black eboshi cap, and a two-piece kamishimo under a black haori coat. The handles of his two swords peak out behind him on the left, the customary position. His red kumadori makeup is typical of main characters, signifying "bravado and a forceful personality." Hanging down over his right knee is a handful of wheat or rice stalks, which are presumably an element of the drama.

The standing figure is in typical pilgrim or travelling priest garb: waraji, a grey robe, and light-coloured leggings and arm covers. In addition, he wears a gong around his waist and carries a shakujō (錫杖) pilgrim's staff. Behind him, the body and straps of a portable shrine are just visible. Heroes and their foes disguising themselves as pilgrims is a popular kabuki motif. The character's aggressive pose—right arm removed from his robe, menacing facial expression—indicates that he is likely not a benign pilgrim.

Play
Beyond the names of two of the actors involved, there is very little in this print to identify the play it documents. Although some kabuki-e and yakusha-e include character or play names, this print offers neither. In addition, having no date stamp or censor seal makes it difficult to identify the play by date.

Records of Edo period kabuki reveal that early in 1798 Yaozō and Omezō appeared together in the play "Tomioka koi no yamabiraki" (also known as "Ninin Shimbei"). Extant images by Toyokuni known to be from this performance—including one featuring Yaozō—however, are very different in style and format from the ROM's print.

In 1803, Yaozō is known to have appeared in Yoshitsune Sembon Zakura, a drama featuring priest and monk characters. As the cast list has been lost, it is unknown whether Omezō also appeared. One Toyokuni print of Yaozō from this play is done in a similar style as the ROM's print, however, the costume is quite different.

Ichikawa Yaozō III
Both the name cartouche in the upper left-hand corner and the kaemon (替紋) personal crest appearing on the kimono arms of the crouching figure in the foreground identify him as Ichikawa Yaozō III (市川八百蔵) (1747–1818). Yaozō, whose professional debut was in 1760, came from a family of kabuki performers. He trained with two very different masters: celebrated onnagata (female role actor) Segawa Kikunojō II, and aragoto ('rough style') master Ichikawa Danjūrō V. He was particularly admired for his performance of wajitsu (calm, clever male hero) roles, and for his portrayal of young women. He appears in several prints by Toyokuni, as well as in prints by Katsukawa Shunkō, Katsukawa Shun'ei and Sharaku.

Ichikawa Omezō I
According to the name cartouche, the standing figure is Ichikawa Omezō I (市川男女蔵) (1781-1833), the first actor in a line of 6 generations continuing to the present day. He specialized in dramatic male tachiyaku (立役) and in jitsuaku (実悪) evil warrior roles. Not surprisingly, given his stature as a kabuki star, he was a popular subject for Toyokuni. One of his most famous portraits is Toyokuni's of him in the famous drama Shibaraku

Date
The ROM labels the print as c. 1801. Although the print has no discernible date or censor seals, Several factors indicate that the print most likely dates to between 1800 and 1804:
 Toyokuni began working with printer Iseya Magobei in 1795, and did a series of "oblong prints of actor pairs" for the publisher in the early 1800s
 Ichikawa Yaozō III took the name Suketakaya Takasuke II in 1804 and ceased to be known as Ichikawa Yaozō

Provenance
The print was donated to the ROM by Sir Edmund Walker (1848–1924), long-time president of the Canadian Bank of Commerce and first Chairman of the Board of Trustees for the ROM. Walker began collecting Japanese art in the 1870s, making him one of the earliest North American collectors. He bought many pieces in New York in the 1870s and '80s, and during a trip to London in 1909. In 1919, after travelling to Japan, China and Korea, he was named Honorary Consul-General of Japan for Toronto.

Print details

 Medium: nishiki-e woodblock print on paper
 Size: chūban
 Format: tate-e
 Japanese title: none
 Exhibit title: Ichikawa Omezō as a Pilgrim and Ichikawa Yaozō as a Samurai
 Subject: scene from an unspecified kabuki play
 Signature: Toyokuni ga (豊国画), left centre edge
 Publisher: Iseya Magobei (伊勢屋孫兵衛)
 Publisher's mark: Isemago/ Iseson, below signature
 Censor seal: none
 Date seal: none
 Genre: yakusha-e, kabuki-e
 Credit line: Gift of Sir Edmund Walker

See also
 Fan print with two bugaku dancers (Kunisada) - Print from same collection, same provenance
 Female Ghost (Kunisada) - Print from same collection
 Unit 88-9 (Kiyomizu Masahiro) - Ceramic sculpture from same collection
 Spring and autumn landscapes (Hara Zaishō) - Painting from same collection
 Eijudō Hibino at Seventy-one (Toyokuni I) - Print from same collection
 Bust portrait of Actor Kataoka Ichizō I (Gochōtei Sadamasu II) - Print in same gallery
 View of Tempōzan Park in Naniwa (Gochōtei Sadamasu) - Print in same gallery

Notes

References
 Calza, Gian Carlo. Ukiyo-e. New York: PHaidon Press, 2005.
 Chiappa, J. Noel. "Utagawa Toyokuni (1769-1825)." 2013. Accessed September 24, 2013. http://mercury.lcs.mit.edu/~jnc/prints/toyokuni.html
 Clark, Timothy, Osamu Ueda and Donald Jenkins. The Actor's Image: Print Makers of the Katsukawa School. Edited by Naomi Noble Richard. Chicago: Art Institute of Chicago, 1994.
 Encyclopædia Britannica. "Utagawa Toyokuni." Accessed September 23, 2013.  http://www.britannica.com/EBchecked/topic/620514/Utagawa-Toyokuni
 JAANUS. "Kabuki-e." Japanese Architecture and Art Net Users System. 2001. Accessed October 4, 2013. http://www.aisf.or.jp/~jaanus/
 JAANUS. "Yakusha-e." Japanese Architecture and Art Net Users System. 2001. Accessed October 4, 2013. http://www.aisf.or.jp/~jaanus/
 Jlearn.net. "Eboshi." Accessed October 4, 2013. http://jlearn.net/Dictionary/Browse/1171580-%E7%83%8F%E5%B8%BD%E5%AD%90-%E3%81%88%E3%81%BC%E3%81%97
 Lane, Richard. Images from the Floating World of the Japanese Print. New York: Konecky & Konecky, 1978.
 Marks, Andreas. Japanese Woodblock Prints: Artists, Publishers and Masterworks 1680-1900. Tokyo: Tuttle, 2010.
 Newland, Amy Reigle. Ed. Hotei Encyclopedia of Woodblock Prints, vol. 2., 2003.
 Percival, Robert. Ukiyo-e: Art for the People. Saint John, New Brunswick: MacMillan Press, 1978.
 Ring, Jessica. "Traditional Kabuki Makeup Tutorial." TypeF. Aug 26, 2011. Accessed October 1, 2013. https://web.archive.org/web/20121025053741/http://www.typef.com/article/traditional-kabuki-makeup-tutorial/#ixzz2fg3XUIEY
 Samurai Archives. "Samurai Clothing." Accessed October 1, 2013. http://www.samurai-archives.com/clothing.html 
 Sekai daihyakka jiten 2nd ed. [世界大百科事典 第２版] "Utagawa Toyokuni" [うたがわとよくに 歌川豊国]. Kotobank.jp. Accessed September 24, 2013. http://kotobank.jp/word/歌川豊国
 Schumacher, Mark. "Objects, Symbols, and Weapons Held by 1000-Armed Kannon & Other Buddhist Deities." 2011. Accessed October 3, 2013. http://www.onmarkproductions.com/html/objects-symbols-weapons-senju.html
 Shōriya, Aragorō. "Suketakaya Takasuke II." Kabuki 21. 2013. Accessed October 1, 2013. http://www.kabuki21.com/takasuke2.php
 Tazawa, Yutaka. Ed. Biographical Dictionary of Japanese Art. Tokyo: Kodansha, 1981.
 The Columbia Electronic Encyclopedia, 6th ed. "Toyokuni." Infoplease.com. 2012. Accessed September 22, 2013. http://www.infoplease.com/encyclopedia/people/toyokuni.html
 Waterhouse, David. Images of Eighteenth Century Japan: Ukiyo-e Prints from the Sir Edmund Walker Collection. Toronto: Royal Ontario Museum, 1975.

External sources
 http://ukiyo-e.org/image/famsf/5050161212810023 - c. 1800 Toyokuni print featuring Omezō and Yaozō from the British Museum
 https://web.archive.org/web/20150518103310/http://enpaku.waseda.ac.jp/db/enpakunishik/results-big.php?shiryo_no=201-5673 - 1801 print by Toyokuni featuring Omezō and Yaozō

Works by Toyokuni I